Jherain is a village near the town of Mandrah in Tehsil Gujar Khan, District Rawalpindi, Pakistan.
The village is at 5 km from the GT (Grand Trunk) Road. Its population is approximately 30,000 inhabitants. Most of the people connected to farming. Wheat, peanut, barley and vegetables are major crops. A little majority are employed in government jobs. The village lacks of basic education and health facility. There is no college, dispensary or bazar. Although it has basic infrastructure of roads and streets.
Pre-partition of Indo-Pak along with Muslims, Hindus and Sikhs also resided here. Social life of people depicts Muslim and Pakistani culture. A notable personality, Ch. Lall Khan, (Late) of this village struggle for the welfare of people. They established a Govt High School (Bhatta) and cemented many streets with the aid of local Government.

According to census 2017 the current population of Jherain Village is 25000.

It is part of Union Council Kuri Dulal Tehsil Gujar Khan..

See also 
 List of Union Councils of Gujar Khan Tehsil

References

Villages in Gujar Khan Tehsil
Populated places in Rawalpindi District